Asterope leprieuri, the Leprieur's glory, is a species of butterfly of the family Nymphalidae. It is found from Colombia to Brazil and Bolivia.

The wingspan is 50–60 mm.

Subspecies
Asterope leprieuri leprieuri (Brazil (Pará))
Asterope leprieuri depuiseti (C. & R. Felder, 1861) (Peru, Bolivia)
Asterope leprieuri optima (Butler, 1869) (Peru, Colombia, Ecuador)
Asterope leprieuri philotima (Rebel, 1912) (Peru)

Etymology
The name honours François Mathias René Leprieur.

References

Biblidinae
Fauna of Brazil
Nymphalidae of South America
Butterflies described in 1835